A Certain Trigger is the debut studio album by English indie rock band Maxïmo Park. It was released on 16 May 2005 through Warp.

Album information
The title for the album comes from the song "Once, a Glimpse".

The songs "The Coast Is Always Changing", "Apply Some Pressure", "Graffiti", "Going Missing" and "I Want You to Stay" were released as singles.

The censored version of "Apply Some Pressure" was used on the soundtracks of the video games Burnout Revenge and SSX on Tour. An instrumental version of "Going Missing" was used during the end credits of the movie Stranger than Fiction.

The album has received Platinum status in the UK. When it was originally released, a limited edition version was available with a bonus CD containing a live performance in Japan. A Certain Trigger sold over 500,000 copies worldwide.

In 2009, the Warp20 (Recreated) compilation included a cover version of the song "Acrobat" by Seefeel.

Reception

Pitchforks Sam Ubl wrote that Maxïmo Park "play jaunty, precise power pop with punk's antipathies, exuding a tentative cool'. CMJ wrote, "These five lads resurrect the trembling, trebly power chords and literate sensibilities of bands like Wire and the Fall... Maximo Park's brand of guitar pop is distinctly British and pogo-ready."

A Certain Trigger was nominated for the 2005 Mercury Prize.

Track listing

Charts

References 

Maxïmo Park albums
2005 debut albums
Warp (record label) albums
Albums produced by Paul Epworth
Songs written by Duncan Lloyd